Mohammad Aadil Alam, also known as Aadil Ansari (born 18 October 2003), is a Nepalese cricketer. Alam has been representing Madhesh Province Cricket Team in domestic cricket. In March 2022, he was named in Nepal's Twenty20 International (T20I) squad for the 2021–22 Nepal T20I Tri-Nation Series. He made his T20I debut on 31 March 2022, against Papua New Guinea. He made his List A debut on 6 May 2022, for Nepal against Zimbabwe A. Later the same month, he was named in Nepal's One Day International (ODI) squad for round 13 of the 2019–2023 ICC Cricket World Cup League 2 in the United States, He made his ODI debut on 11 June 2022, against the United States, where he took three wickets.

Controversy
On 23 Jan, 2023 He was arrested by Nepal police in charge of Match Fixing.

References

External links
 

2003 births
Living people
Nepalese cricketers
Nepal One Day International cricketers
Nepal Twenty20 International cricketers
People from Bara District